El Ídolo de Mexico is an album by Mexican musician and songwriter Vicente Fernández, released in 1974 by CBS. In 2015, it was selected by Billboard magazine as one of the "50 Essential Latin Albums of the Last 50 Years".

Track listing
Side A
 "Si Acaso Vuelves"
 "Las Llaves de mi Alma"
 "El Precio"
 "No Vas a Creer"
 "El Rey"
 "Yo Quiero Ser tu Amante"
 "El Arracadas"

Side B
 "Que te Vaya Bonito"
 "Volvió Por Ella"
 "Amor Indio"
 "Tu Amor Soñado"

References

1974 albums
Vicente Fernández albums